Johann Adam Klein (24 November 1792, Nuremberg – 21 May 1875, Munich) was a German painter and engraver.

Biography
At the age of eight, he received his first drawing lessons from the landscape etcher, Georg Christoph von Bemmel (1765-1811). From 1802, he attended the Nuremberg drawing school, under Gustav Philipp Zwinger. Three years later, he became an apprentice in the studios of the copper engraver, who taught him etching. Gabler noticed that he had a special talent for drawing animals, so he sent him to the  cattle market to sketch.

With support from the art dealer, he went to Vienna in 1811, where he enrolled at the Academy of Fine Arts. Inspired by the Napoleonic Wars, he drew and etched the soldiers of the warring parties, in their uniforms and with their baggage, their horses and wagons, in great detail.

Back in Nuremberg in 1815, he made a survey of the Rhine with Count Erwein von Schönborn, a noted art collector. He was back in Vienna the following year, with his friend, the etcher , where Prince Klemens Wenzel Lothar von Metternich became a patron and sent him to Hungary to study and sketch horses. He continued to travel, seeking inspiration for his works, visiting Styria and making his way to Italy, with the help of a grant from Prince Louis of Bavaria, where he was in contact with the German artists' colony in Rome.

He finally settled down in 1823, when he married Karoline Wüst, and remained in Nuremberg until her death in 1837. Shortly after, he moved to Munich where, in 1839, he married the widow of an engraver named Wolf. He remained there until his death in 1875.

Sources 
 
 
 Klein, Johann Adam. In: Hans Vollmer (Ed.): Allgemeines Lexikon der Bildenden Künstler von der Antike bis zur Gegenwart, Vol.20: Kaufmann–Knilling. E. A. Seemann, Leipzig 1927, pp. 440–442.
 Johann Adam Klein 1792–1875. Zeichnungen und Aquarelle. Collection catalog of the Stadtgeschichtlichen Museen Nürnberg, Renate Freitag-Stadler (Ed.), Verlag Hans Carl, Nürnberg 1975. 
 
 Romantische Entdeckungen – Johann Adam Klein (1792–1875). Gemälde, Zeichnungen, Druckgrafik. Exhibition catalog, Museen der Stadt Nürnberg, Nürnberg 2006.

External links 

 
 
 Johann Adam Klein in Google Arts & Culture

1792 births
1875 deaths
Artists from Nuremberg
German engravers
19th-century German painters
19th-century German male artists
German male painters